William Jarvis (1770–1859) was an American diplomat, financier and philanthropist best known for introducing the merino breed of sheep into the United States from Spain.

Biography

Early life, education and career
Born in Boston to a Boston Brahmin family, William Jarvis was the son of Dr. Charles Jarvis, a Boston physician who owned the former Governor William Shirley house on today's State Street. His son William watched the elder Jarvis, an ardent patriot, deliver addresses during the Revolutionary era, and later recalled hearing Boston Sheriff Handerson read the Declaration of Independence from the balcony of the Old State House. Like other prominent Bostonians of his day, Jarvis had a mingling of Revolution and money-making in his genes.

He was sent to schools in Boston, Philadelphia and New Jersey, and completed his mercantile training in a Norfolk, Virginia, counting house. He returned to Boston and entered into business for himself. Within six years disaster struck: Jarvis had guaranteed the debt of a New York City mercantile house belonging to a friend and business associate, which obligation the friend defaulted on. Jarvis paid off the liabilities, but it entailed selling many of his own assets. Fledgling merchant Jarvis was nearly wiped out. To recoup his fortune, he bought a clipper ship and moved to Europe, where he dealt widely across the continent in commodities and built a successful trading house, William Jarvis & Co.

Success in wool trade

As a result of his European trading, Jarvis became familiar with Lisbon, Portugal, and being well-connected in Washington, D.C., was appointed by President Thomas Jefferson as the United States consul in Lisbon. Jarvis served in the post for a decade. Before returning to the United States, Jarvis purchased a flock of some 4,000 merino sheep and smuggled them out of Spain, taking advantage of Napoleon's conquest in snapping the Spanish stranglehold on the merino wool market. It was a strategic move: Jarvis kept State Department officers apprised of his every move in snagging some of the rare merinos.

On returning to America, Jarvis gave eight merino sheep to Jefferson. He made an additional gift to sitting President James Madison as well. Jarvis sold some of his new merino sheep, but kept most of them at his newly purchased estate in Weathersfield, Vermont, where he had secured the services of a Spanish shepherd to tend them. Jarvis became a 'merino zealot,' speaking to audiences around America and extolling the virtues of the newly imported breed. He employed up to 20 seasonal workers at his Weathersfield Bow compound, census data show, to handle the labor-intensive tasks associated with wool production and sheep raising. Eventually Jarvis had the sheep bred and sold nationwide. He also employed a network of merchants in Europe and America who assisted him in selling his wool across America and the continent. In addition, he funneled some into a textile mill he partially owned in Quechee, Vermont.

For several decades, especially following the blockade during the War of 1812, when prohibitions on British wool sent demand for domestic wool soaring, Jarvis' strategy yielded prodigious returns. So-called 'merino mania' gripped Vermont. Farmers clamored for the newly imported breed, and sheep raising skyrocketed across the East Coast. Newly built New England textile mills gobbled up all the wool they could get. Prices skyrocketed for the fine merino wool with its unique water-shedding qualities and longer fiber. Vermont became the toast of the nation's agricultural community. By 1830 merino sheep had become the state's principal livestock.

A few statistics tell the story. Merino sheep were more productive than other breeds—a secret well-known to the Spanish, and the reason why the Spanish guarded their flocks so closely. Prior to the introduction of the merino, New England farmers had two breeds of sheep from which to choose, neither noted for the quality of its fleece. The coming of the merino changed all that. In 1812, the average fleece of a Vermont sheep was only six percent of the animal's weight. By 1844, that figure had more than doubled to 15 percent, and by 1865 it had risen to 21 percent. This was monumental change, and it wrought a sheep boom that filled the pockets of Vermont farmers.

That euphoria did not last. By 1837, there were over one million sheep in Vermont. But the industry was held captive to the nation's evolving tariff laws, alternately shielding and then exposing domestic producers to cutthroat foreign competition. Jarvis himself spent tens of thousands of dollars on pamphlets arguing the case for tariffs and trying to jawbone legislators, including Henry Clay, into supporting them.

The price of a pound of wool dropped from 57 cents in 1835 to 25 cents in the late 1840s. Vermont producers, who were among the highest-cost producers in America, given the state's small farms and rocky land, were squeezed hard. Many farmers went out of business, and others had to scramble to keep their farms and not go hungry. Today the small village of Weathersfield, once the envy of its day with its fine old stone church, bears mute testimony to the glory days of 'merino mania.'

William Jarvis, one of the most powerful Democratic-Republicans in the Connecticut River Valley, a gentleman farmer and wealthy, earned a reputation during those dark days for helping Vermont farmers with his largesse.

Family
In 1808, he married Mary Pepperell Sparhawk of Boston, a fellow descendant of Sir William Pepperell of Massachusetts. (Jarvis' wife was the niece of his mother, the former Mary Pepperell Sparhawk Jarvis.) Mary Sparhawk bore him two children before her death in 1811.  Six years later, he married Anna Bailey Bartlett, the daughter of Hon. Bailey Bartlett of Haverhill, Massachusetts, a member of the convention that drafted the U.S. Constitution, a Presidential Elector, a High Sheriff of Essex County (to which post he was appointed by John Hancock) as well as State Senator and County Treasurer. William Jarvis and the former Anna Bartlett had ten children.

Death and legacy

William Jarvis died in 1859. Earlier, in 1813, Jarvis had deeded land in Weathersfield to the local school district with the proviso that the Jarvis family could use some portion of the land as their family burial ground in perpetuity. Consul Jarvis was laid to rest in that burying ground in Weathersfield, near his home in Weathersfield Bow in 1859. Other family members, including his son Major Charles Jarvis, lie interred beside him today.

Even in death, Consul Jarvis's ties to merino sheep would overshadow his other accomplishments. The epitaph on his gravestone reads: "William Jarvis, son of Dr. Charles Jarvis born in Boston 4 February 1770 died 21 October 1859. He was consul for Lisbon and acting Charge d'affairs of the United States for Portugal from 1802 to 1811. To have served nine years in a difficult situation, under such able and patriotic presidents as Thomas Jefferson and James Madison is alone a sufficient eulogy on his fidelity and capacity. He was the first large importer from Spain and distributor throughout the Union of that useful animal, the Merino sheep, which greatly contributed to lay the foundation of the woolen manufactures of this country. His early life was checkered by the vicissitudes of fortune but by industry, perseverance, intelligence and good faith, he made himself independent, and spent his latter years in tranquil retirement amidst a numerous family; his last aspiration of affection being gratified by laying his bones in peace amidst those whom he loved in life." On Jarvis's tombstone is carved a merino sheep in bas relief.

The lasting legacy of William Jarvis may be the landscape he left behind. Before the advent of merino, much of Vermont was fenced with timber. The merino boom gave Vermont farmers a purpose for all those rock cairns dotting the hills they had struggled to till. Farmers hard-pressed to find enough timber for fencing turned to stone, constructing walls that are now iconic to today's Vermont landscape.

See also
 Leavitt Hunt

References

Further reading
VHS MSS: William Jarvis Vermont Historical Society, 1996-12-30.  Accessed 2008-04-09.
The Democratic Dilemma: Religion, Reform and the Social Order in the Connecticut River Valley of Vermont, 1791–1850, Randolph A. Roth, 1987, Cambridge University Press, pp. 16, 103, 107, 113, 144, 145, 173-177, etc., on William Jarvis
Excerpts from Correspondence between President Thomas Jefferson and William Jarvis, University of Virginia, virginia.edu Excerpts from Correspondence between President Thomas Jefferson and William Jarvis, University of Virginia, virginia.edu
 The Life and Times of Hon. William Jarvis of Weathersfield, Vermont, by His Daughter, Mary Pepperell Sparhawk Jarvis Cutts, Hurd and Houghton, New York, 1869

External links
William Jarvis's Farm, Vermont Historical Society
William Jarvis State Historical Marker, Weathersfield History, Town of Weathersfield
Grave of Mary Pepperell Jarvis, Haverhill, Massachusetts
William Jarvis and Merino Sheep, Vermont Historial Society
Death of the Hon. William Jarvis of Vermont, The New York Times, 25 October 1859

1770 births
1859 deaths
18th-century American businesspeople
19th-century American diplomats
American people of Welsh descent
American ranchers
County treasurers in Massachusetts
Massachusetts sheriffs
People from Weathersfield, Vermont
Businesspeople from Boston
American consuls